Drahomíra is a traditional Czech and Slovak female given name which means precious and peaceful from the Slavic element dorgu "precious" combined with mir "peace". The male, less frequent, form is Drahomír (or Dragomir). Nicknames are Draha, Drahuše, Drahusha, Drahomirka, Draga, Mira, Mirka.

Drahomíra's name day in the Czech Republic is 18 July, in Slovakia 16 January. Its equivalent in Polish, Bulgarian, Serbian and Croatian languages is Dragomira (with male form Dragomir).

Drahomíra, a Bohemian duchess is the most famous historical bearer of the name.

References 
 Miloslava Knappová: Jak se bude vaše dítě jmenovat (What will be name of your child), 2006 (4th edition), .

Feminine given names
Czech feminine given names
Slovak feminine given names